Some Fools There Were is a 1913 American silent short comedy film starring William Garwood, Riley Chamberlin, Jean Darnell, Florence La Badie, and William Russell.

Cast
 Florence La Badie as The Girl Reporter
 Jean Darnell as The Aunt
 William Garwood as First Unsuspecting Bachelor
 William Russell as Second Unsuspecting Bachelor
 Riley Chamberlin as Third Unsuspecting Bachelor

External links

1913 films
1913 comedy films
Silent American comedy films
American silent short films
American black-and-white films
1913 short films
American comedy short films
1910s American films